Action for Autism (AFA) is an Indian non-profit, education, training and advocacy organisation which provides support and services to persons with autism and those who work with them. Founded in 1991, AFA is the parent organisation began with the goal to "put autism on the Indian map." Awareness of autism in India has grown tremendously in the past decade, and AFA's activities have also changed to meet current needs in India. AFA works through direct services, advocacy, and research to improve the lives of children with autism and their families. AFA is an Indian organisation, and its efforts are focused on the needs of those in India. AFA is also committed to assisting other countries in South Asia achieve legal recognition of autism and develop services for children and families. To more effectively orchestrate national activities for autism, it was relocated to the AFA National Centre for Advocacy Research and Training in 2006.

See also
 Autism therapies
 Aapki Antara

References
 Understanding Autism
 'Best thing that happened to autism'
  Autism - the challenges ahead
  Artistic eminence in the service of a cause
  Autism - the challenges ahead
 Tackling autism

1991 establishments in Delhi
Autism-related organisations in India
Organizations established in 1991